Rob Moran (born May 12, 1963) is an actor and producer. He has appeared in the Farrelly brothers' films Dumb and Dumber, Kingpin, There's Something About Mary, Shallow Hal, and Hall Pass. Moran also played the Carlin family patriarch in the American teen drama South Of Nowhere, and an ER doctor in Meet Dave. He later appeared as the doomed patriarch in the 2011 horror movie You're Next. He has made guest appearances in numerous television series as well. Since 1986, Moran has appeared in over 60 films - both screen and television - and produced a few of them as well.

Personal life
Moran graduated from Emerson College in 1982. In 1985, Rob and actress Julie Bryan began dating after being paired together on a Ford automotive commercial. They were married in 1987. In 1999, the couple welcomed their eldest daughter Maiya Dupree. In 2004, their second daughter Makayla-Amet was born.

Filmography

Film

Television

References

External links
 
 

1963 births
Living people
American male film actors
American male television actors
Mexican male film actors
20th-century American male actors
21st-century American male actors